Video coding, in the postal market, refers to entering address details manually if they cannot be retrieved automatically by OCR software. The address details on the postal items will be scanned by the sorting machine and this image will be sent to a computer that is connected to the network. Professionally trained data specialists receive the image, enter the correct address details and send them back, so that the sorting machine can sort the mail properly. Video coding is a crucial process for parcel and postal logistics providers, as 3 – 7% of all shipments require manual data entry.

Causes of Unsuccessful OCR Readings 

 Unique handwriting styles can challenge technology’s accuracy in reading them
 Glare caused by reflective envelopes can distort images of address labels, making them difficult to read
 Information located outside of designated fields can pose a challenge for OCR readers in identifying the correct address
 Wrinkled or folded address labels can be hard for machines to interpret

Real-time vs. off-line 
 In the case of real-time video coding, the address details are returned within seconds, so that the sorting machine can sort the mail instantly.
 In the case of offline video coding, the address details are returned after a few hours, so that the mail needs to be fed to the sorting machine for a second time.

On-side vs. off-side 
 In the case of on-side video coding, the process is performed locally or on workstations installed directly on the infeed conveyor belts.  
 In the case of off-side video coding, the workstations can be placed in one building, in different locations in a single country or across several countries. The off-side video coding was introduced by companies such as Prime Vision and PostNL Shore to improve the services and flexibility of postal organizations.

References 

Postal systems